Fizeș may refer to several places in Romania:

 Fizeș, a village in Berzovia Commune, Caraș-Severin County
 Fizeș, a village in Băița Commune, Hunedoara County
 Fizeș, a village in Sâg Commune, Sălaj County
 Fizeș (Bârzava), a river in Caraș-Severin County
 Fizeș (Someș), a river in Cluj County